WFFX (103.7 FM, "103.7 The Fox") is a mainstream rock music formatted radio station licensed to Hattiesburg, Mississippi, serving the Laurel-Hattiesburg Arbitron market.

External links

Active rock radio stations in the United States
FFX
Radio stations established in 1966
IHeartMedia radio stations